Kawanishi's first aircraft, the Kawanishi K-1, was designed as a mail carrier. It was the first Japanese aircraft to receive a Certificate of Airworthiness from the Aviation Bureau. It won a prize in a national contest but was not a commercial success and only one was built.

Design and development
Design work on the K-1 began in February 1921 and construction was completed in December 1920. It had an American engine and was influenced by current American engineering practices.

With an all-wood structure and fabric covering it was a two bay biplane with rectangular plan wings, each bay separated by parallel pairs of interplane struts. The upper wing was joined to the fuselage by a cabane formed by parallel pairs of short struts on each side. The lower wing passed just below the fuselage.

The K-1 was powered by a  Hall-Scott L-6 water-cooled six cylinder inline mounted in a bullet-shaped nose. Behind the engine the fuselage was flat-sided with rounded decking. There were two open cockpits close together, the forward one under the trailing edge of the wing, which had a cut-out to improve the upward field of view. The tail was conventional with generous horizontal surfaces mounted on top of the fuselage.

Its landing gear was fixed and conventional with a short tail skid but details of the main legs and wheels are lacking.

The first flight was made around the turn of 1920-1. Later, it was re-engined  with a  Daimler engine and directional stability was improved was increased with a new, long, low, flat-topped fin of greater area.

Operational history
In May 1921, quite soon after the first flight, the K-1 competed in the Second Prize-winning Flight Competition, sponsored by the Imperial Flying Association. It also gained second prize in the speed contest, reaching .

The Japanese Aviation Bureau began issuing Certificates of Airworthiness on 11 May 1921 and the K-1 received the first of these.

Despite its competition success, the K-1 was not accepted as a commercial mail carrier and only one was built.

Specifications

References

Biplanes
Single-engined tractor aircraft
1920s Japanese civil aircraft
Mailplanes
K-1